The Battle of Çıldır was fought in 1578 during the Ottoman–Safavid War (1578–1590) .

Background 

The peace between the Ottoman Empire and Persian (Safavid) Empire after the treaty of Amasya continued from 1555 to 1578. When Murat III of the Ottoman Empire ascended to the throne in 1574, Tahmasp I of Persia sent presents to Murat III. But before the Persian delegation left İstanbul, the Ottoman capital, Tahmasp died (1576). The new shah was  Ismail II who changed the peaceful policy towards Ottomans and began hostilities in the border area.  Meanwhile, the governor of Lorestan, a part of Persia, took refuge in Ottoman lands, an event which further created tension between the two empires. İsmail II soon died and during the interregnum following his death, the Ottoman Porte decided to declare war. The war continued during the reign of Mohammed Khodabanda in Persia.

Battle 

After initial combat in so-called Cambaz Çukuru, the main battle was around a small fort named Çıldır in north-eastern Anatolia. The commander of the Ottoman army was Lala Mustafa Pasha and the commander of the Persian army was Mohammad Khan Tokhmaq Ustajlu who had represented Persia in Istanbul after Murad III's accession. Tokhmak Khan also had a Georgian army under his command, Georgia being a Persian vassal (and its royal families being related by marriage). Tokhmak Khan tried to encircle the Ottoman army and was about to succeed when Ottoman commander Özdemiroğlu Osman Pasha intervened and defeated him.

Aftermath 
Although Persians tried to attack Ottoman supply units after the battle, they were forced to retreat and when a bridge was wrecked during this retreat they lost further troops.  These defeats left the Caucasus to Ottoman conquest. Lala Mustafa Pasha soon conquered Tiflis, the Georgian capital. The next step was the conquest of Derbent (present Republic of Dagestan in Russia). By this conquest Ottomans were able to reach the Caspian Sea.

See also 
 Lala Mustafa Pasha's Caucasian campaign
 Battle of Torches
 Treaty of Istanbul (1590)
 Ottoman–Persian Wars

References

Sources 
 

Cildir
Cildir
Cildir
History of Ardahan Province
Cildir
History of Kars Province
16th century in Iran
1578 in the Ottoman Empire
16th century in Georgia (country)